Lawrence P. Murphy (April 1, 1910 – August 17, 1975) was an American politician who served in the New York State Assembly from 1945 to 1970.

He died of a heart attack on August 17, 1975, in Queens, New York City, New York at age 65.

References

1910 births
1975 deaths
Democratic Party members of the New York State Assembly
20th-century American politicians